The discography of American rock band Creedence Clearwater Revival, who released their first album and singles in July 1968, includes 7 studio albums, 3 live albums, 41 compilation albums, and 29 singles. The group, although  only active for 4 years, has sold more than 30 million albums and singles in the United States alone, and has charted in multiple countries throughout the world.

Creedence Clearwater Revival never had a #1 hit. They have had the most singles to reach the top 10 (nine) without ever reaching number 1.

Albums

Studio albums

Live albums

Compilation albums
{| class="wikitable plainrowheaders" style="text-align:center;"
|-
! rowspan="2"| Year
! rowspan="2" width="250"| TitleAlbum details
! colspan="10"| Peak chart positions
! rowspan="2"| Certifications
|- style="font-size:smaller;"
! width="30"| US
! width="30"| CAN
! width="30"| AUS
! width="30"| FIN
! width="30"| GER
! width="30"| JPN
! width="30"| NL
! width="30"| NOR
! width="30"| SWE
! width="30"| UK
|-
! scope="row"| Spirit Orgaszmus
|
 Side A: Creedence Clearwater Revival
 Side B: Jeronimo
 Released: 1970
 Label: Bellaphon (BI 1527)
 Format: LP
| —
| —
| —
| —
| 6
| —
| —
| —
| —
| —
|
|-
! scope="row"| Creedence Gold
|
 Released: 1972
 Label: Fantasy (F-9418)
 Format: LP, 8-track
| 15
| 9
| 9
| —
| —
| 14
| 7
| —
| —
| —
|
 RIAA: 2× Platinum
|-
! scope="row"| More Creedence Gold
|
 Released: 1973
 Label: Fantasy (F-9430)
 Format: LP
| 61
| 49
| 41
| —
| —
| 28
| 9
| —
| —
| —
|
RIAA: Gold
|-
! scope="row"| 20 Super Hits
|
 Released: 1973
 Label: Fantasy/Bellaphon (BS 45004)
 Format: LP
| —
| —
| —
| —
| 42
| —
| —
| —
| —
| —
|
|-
! scope="row"| Chronicle, Vol. 1
|
 Released: 1976
 Label: Fantasy (CCR-2)
 Format: LP, CD
| 18
| —
| 29
| —
| 50
| —
| 70
| —
| —
| —
|
RIAA: Diamond
BPI: Gold
MC: Gold
 ARIA: 4× Platinum
|-
! scope="row"| Hot Stuff
|
 Released: 1976
 Label: Fantasy (53301)
 Format: LP
| —
| —
| —
| —
| —
| —
| —
| —
| —
| —
|
RIAA: Gold
|-
! scope="row"| The Best of Creedence Clearwater Revival
|
 Released: 1977
 Label: K-tel
 Format: LP
| —
| —
| —
| —
| 10
| —
| —
| —
| —
| —
|
|-
! scope="row"| 20 Golden Greats
|
 Released: 1979
 Label: Fantasy
 Format: LP
| —
| —
| 1
| —
| —
| —
| —
| —
| —
| —
|
 AUS: Platinum
|-
! scope="row"| Best of Creedence Clearwater Revival
|
 Released: 1980
 Label: K-tel
 Format: LP
| —
| —
| —
| 5
| —
| —
| —
| —
| —
| —
|
|-
! scope="row"| Hey Tonight
|
 Released: 1981
 Label: Metronome (0061.138)
 Format: LP
| —
| —
| —
| —
| 1
| —
| —
| —
| —
| —
|
|-
! scope="row"| Greatest Hits
|
 Released: 1981
 Label:
 Format: LP
| 61
| —
| —
| —
| —
| —
| 7
| —
| —
| —
|
|-
! scope="row"| Creedence Country
|
 Released: 1981
 Label: Fantasy
 Format: LP
| —
| —
| —
| —
| —
| —
| —
| —
| —
| —
|
|-
! scope="row"| Hits Album
|
 Released: 1982
 Label: Fantasy
 Format: 
| —
| —
| —
| —
| —
| —
| —
| —
| —
| —
|
|-
! scope="row"| Chooglin'''
|
 Released: 1982
 Label: Fantasy (F-9621)
 Format: LP
| 202
| —
| —
| —
| —
| —
| —
| —
| —
| —
|
|-
! scope="row"| Creedence Clearwater Revival|
 Released: 1983
 Label: Amiga (STEREO 8 56 008)
 Format: LP
| —
| —
| —
| —
| —
| —
| —
| —
| —
| —
|
|-
! scope="row"| At the Movies|
 Released: 1985
 Label: Fantasy
 Format: LP, Cassette
| —
| —
| —
| —
| —
| —
| —
| —
| —
| —
|
|-
! scope="row"| The Complete Hit-Album|
 Released: 1985
 Label: Arcade (01 2790 22)
 Format: LP, CD
| —
| —
| —
| —
| —
| —
| 22
| —
| —
| —
|
|-
! scope="row"| Chronicle, Vol. 2|
 Released: 1986
 Label: Fantasy (CCR-3)
 Format: LP, CD
| —
| —
| —
| —
| —
| —
| 70
| —
| —
| —
|
|-
! scope="row"| Rollin' on the River|
 Released: 1988
 Label: Fantasy (53302)
 Format: LP
| —
| —
| —
| —
| —
| —
| —
| —
| —
| —
|
RIAA: Gold
|-
! scope="row"| 21st Anniversary: The Ultimate Collection (24 Classic Hits)|
 Released: 1989
 Label: Fantasy (93335)
 Format: LP
| —
| —
| 3
| —
| —
| —
| —
| —
| —
| —
|
 ARIA: 7× Platinum
|-
! scope="row"| All Time Hits|
 Released: 1990
 Label: Euros (SIN 1060)
 Format: LP
| —
| —
| —
| 22
| —
| —
| —
| —
| —
| —
|
 IFPI FIN: Gold
|-
! scope="row"| More Hits|
 Released: 1991
 Label: Euros
 Format: LP
| —
| —
| —
| 29
| —
| —
| —
| —
| —
| —
|
|-
! scope="row"| The Best of CCR|
 Released: 1993
 Label: Polydor (740 002-2/4)
 Format: CD
| —
| 13
| —
| —
| —
| —
| —
| —
| —
| —
|
 MC: 2× Platinum
|-
! scope="row"| Really the Best|
 Released: 1994
 Label: ZYX (55017-2)
 Format: CD
| —
| —
| —
| —
| 43
| —
| 58
| —
| —
| —
|
|-
! scope="row"| CCR Forever – 36 Greatest Hits|
 Released: 1994
 Label: Amigo (CC-8200)
 Format: CD
| —
| —
| —
| 10
| —
| —
| 1
| 20
| —
| —
|
|-
! scope="row"| Keep on Chooglin'|
 Released: 1995
 Label: Fantasy (TVD98013)
 Format: CD
| —
| —
| 13
| —
| —
| —
| —
| —
| —
| —
|
ARIA: Platinum
|-
! scope="row"| The Ultimate Collection|
 Released: 1997
 Label: Fantasy
 Format: CD
| —
| —
| 11
| —
| —
| —
| —
| —
| —
| —
|
|-
! scope="row"| All Time Greatest Hits|
 Released: 1998
 Label: ZYX (81157-2)
 Format: CD
| —
| —
| —
| —
| —
| —
| 38
| —
| —
| —
|
|-
! scope="row"| The Very Best of Creedence Clearwater Revival|
 Released: 1999
 Label: Fantasy/EastWest (3984 26711 2)
 Format: CD
| —
| —
| —
| —
| —
| —
| —
| —
| —
| —
|
|-
! scope="row"| At the Movies (Reissue)
|
 Released: 2000
 Label: Fantasy (4539)
 Format: CD
| —
| —
| —
| —
| —
| —
| —
| —
| —
| —
|
|-
! scope="row"| Platinum|
 Released: 2001
 Label: Amigo (CCR 40)
 Format: CD
| —
| —
| —
| 10
| —
| —
| —
| 2
| 3
| —
|
 IFPI FIN: Platinum
|-
! scope="row"| Creedence Clearwater Revival: Box Set|
 Released: October 2, 2001
 Label: Fantasy (4434)
 Format: CD
| —
| —
| —
| —
| —
| —
| —
| —
| —
| —
|
|-
! scope="row"| Bad Moon Rising: The Best of Creedence Clearwater Revival|
 Released: 2003
 Label: Fantasy
 Format: CD
| —
| —
| —
| —
| —
| —
| —
| —
| —
| —
|
BPI: Gold
|-
! scope="row"| Scandinavian Collection|
 Released: 2005
 Label: Amigo
 Format: CD
| —
| —
| —
| —
| —
| —
| —
| —
| 15
| —
|
|-
! scope="row"| Chronicle: The 20 Greatest Hits|
 Released: 2005
 Label: Universal (9154)
 Format: CD
| 22
| —
| 22
| —
| —
| —
| —
| 40
| 59
| —
|
BPI: Gold
 ARIA: 6× Platinum
|-
! scope="row"| Best Of|
 Released: 2008
 Label: Fantasy (30870-02)
 Format: CD
| —
| —
| 36
| 40
| —
| —
| —
| 3
| 2
| —
|
BPI: Platinum
|-
! scope="row"| Collected|
 Released: 2008
 Label: Universal (531 096-4)
 Format: CD
| —
| —
| —
| —
| —
| —
| 1
| —
| —
| —
|
|-
! scope="row"| Creedence Clearwater Revival – 40th Anniversary Editions Box Set|
 Released: 2009
 Label: Fantasy
 Format: CD
| —
| —
| —
| 41
| —
| —
| —
| —
| —
| —
|
|-
! scope="row"| Creedence Clearwater Revival Cover the Classics|
 Released: 2009
 Label: Fantasy (0888072314221)
 Format: CD
| —
| —
| —
| —
| —
| —
| —
| —
| —
| —
|
|-
! scope="row"| The Singles Collection|
 Released: 2009
 Label: Fantasy (31752)
 Format: CD
| —
| —
| —
| —
| —
| —
| —
| —
| —
| —
|
|-
! scope="row"| Ultimate Creedence Clearwater Revival – Greatest Hits & All-Time Classics|
 Released: 2012
 Label: Fantasy
 Format: 3CD
| —
| —
| 10
| —
| —
| —
| —
| —
| —
| —
|
 ARIA: Platinum
|-
| align="center" colspan="17" style="font-size:8pt"| "—" denotes releases that did not chart.
|}

Singles

Music videos

See also
The Golliwogs discography
John Fogerty discography
Tom Fogerty discographyCosmo''

References

External links

Discography
Discographies of American artists
Rock music group discographies